Hylaeamys perenensis, formerly Oryzomys perenensis, also known as the western Amazonian oryzomys, is an oryzomyine rodent of the family Cricetidae.

It is found in western Amazonia (southeastern Colombia, eastern Ecuador, eastern Peru, northern Bolivia, and western Brazil).

It has an omnivorous diet and is nocturnal, terrestrial, and nonsocial. It is commonly found along rivers.

References

Hylaeamys
Rodents of South America
Fauna of the Amazon
Mammals described in 1901
Taxa named by Joel Asaph Allen